Events from the year 1644 in art.

Events
 Nicolas Poussin begins to paint the second series of Seven Sacraments.

Works

Paintings

 Hans Gillisz. Bollongier – Blumenstück ("Piece of Flower")
 Claude Lorrain
 Odysseus Returns Chryseis to Her Father
 Pastoral Landscape with the Arch of Titus
 View of Tivoli at Sunset
 William Dobson – John, 1st Baron Byron (approximate date)
 Sebastian Stoskopff – Glasses in a Basket
 David Teniers the Younger – The Smokers
 Diego Velázquez – Coronation of the Virgin

Sculpture
 Alessandro Algardi – Tomb of Pope Leo XI

Births
April - Abraham Storck, Dutch landscape and maritime painter of the Baroque era (died 1708)
date unknown
Étienne Allegrain, French topographical painter (died 1736)
Francisco Antolínez, Spanish historical and landscape painter (died 1700)
Domenico Bettini, Italian painter of still lifes (d. unknown)
Jacob van Huchtenburg, Dutch painter (died 1675)
Yang Jin, Chinese painter during the Qing Dynasty (died 1728)
Simon Pietersz Verelst, Dutch Golden Age painter (died 1710)
date unknown - Pietro Erardi, Maltese chaplain and painter (died 1727)
probable
Marziale Carpinoni, Italian painter of the Baroque period (died 1722)
Elizabeth Haselwood English silversmith (died 1715)

Deaths
January 20 – Stefano Amadei, Italian still-life painter (born 1580)
February – Johannes van der Beeck, Dutch painter (born 1589)
May 11 - Domingos da Cunha, Portuguese painter (born 1598)
June 14 - Jean Toutin, French enamel worker, one of the first artists to make enamel portrait miniatures (born 1578)
July 16 – Giovanni Biliverti, Italian Mannerist painter (born 1585)
August 2 – Bernardo Strozzi, Italian painter (born 1581)
November 27 – Francisco Pacheco, Spanish painter and writer on painting (born 1564)
date unknown
Giovanni Maria Bottala, Italian painter (born 1613)
Giovanni Battista Calandra, Italian mosaic artist (born 1568)
George Jamesone, Scottish portrait painter (born 1587)
Ni Yuanlu, Chinese calligrapher and painter during the Ming Dynasty (born 1593)
Claudio Ridolfi, Italian painter (born 1560)
Bernard van Linge, Dutch glass and enamel painter (born 1598)
Cui Zizhong, Chinese painter during the Ming Dynasty (born unknown)

References 

 
Years of the 17th century in art
1640s in art